'Telstar' is a cultivar of domesticated apple that originated in Greytown, Wairarapa, New Zealand. It has the same parentage as the 'Gala'.

References

Apple cultivars
New Zealand apples